Detroit United is an American amateur soccer team based in Detroit, Michigan, United States. Founded in 2002, the team plays in Region II of the United States Adult Soccer Association, a network of amateur leagues at the fifth tier of the American Soccer Pyramid.

The team plays its home games at Bicentennial Park in nearby Livonia, Michigan. The team's colors are red, white and blue.

History
Founded in 2002 by George Juncaj, a former semi-professional soccer player from Montenegro, Detroit United plays in the Michigan Premier Soccer League, which is a member of the United States Adult Soccer Association Region II group of leagues. United finished second in the MPSL Premier Division in 2006, third in 2007, and second again in 2008.

United entered the Lamar Hunt U.S. Open Cup for the first time in 2007, but lost to RWB Adria in the regional qualification semi finals. They qualified for the tournament for the first time in 2010, beating Nebraska team 402 FC in a PK shootout in the final round of their regional qualification tournament, before losing 2-0 to professional USL Second Division side Pittsburgh Riverhounds in the first round of the tournament proper.

Players

2010 USOC roster

Year-by-year

Head coaches
  George Juncaj (2005–present)

Stadia
 Bicentennial Park; Livonia, Michigan (????-present)

References

External links
 Michigan Premier Soccer League

Soccer clubs in Michigan
2002 establishments in Michigan
Association football clubs established in 2002